Marguerite Perrou (21 October 1916 – 5 February 2013) was a French sprinter. She competed in the women's 100 metres at the 1936 Summer Olympics.

References

External links
 

1916 births
2013 deaths
Athletes (track and field) at the 1936 Summer Olympics
French female sprinters
Olympic athletes of France
Place of birth missing
Olympic female sprinters